Ixsir is a Lebanese wine company established in 2008. The winery is located just outside Batroun, north Lebanon.

The name is derived from the Arabic word for "elixir" (Al-Ikseer).

Jean-Marc Quarin awarded it "best grade for a Lebanese wine" at Bordeaux's La Semaine des Primeurs 09.

History
IXSIR was founded in 2008 by Etienne Debbane, Hady Kahale, Carlos Ghosn and Gabriel Rivero. IXSIR entered the Lebanese market in 2010, and quickly became the fastest growing wine on the Lebanese and on the export markets.

IXSIR was one of only two Lebanese producers present at Bordeaux's famous "La Semaine des Primeurs", an event hosted exclusively for the evaluation and tasting of French and international wines.

The company was present at the Horeca Hospitality exhibition as one of ten producers to compete at the event’s first-ever wine pavilion with blind wine tasting contests. Ixsir was awarded the "Revelation of the Public" for its 2009 Grande Reserve White and the Media and Press award for its 2009 White.

On May 11, 2010, IXSIR joined the Union Vinicole du Liban (UVL) and participated in a wine tasting event held in Paris for international wine experts and professionals.

Products
The only Middle Eastern country without a desert, Lebanon's topography is favorable for wine production as it consists of mountains, valleys, and coastal areas that are hospitable to many different grape varieties. 
Ixsir cultivates its wine grapes in several different zones, including Batroun in the North, Jezzine in the South, and the Bekaa Valley in the East.Ixsir produces a wide spectrum of grape varieties, from Cabernet Sauvignon, Syrah, Tempranillo, Caladoc, and Viognier, Muscat, Sauvignon blanc, Chardonnay and Sémillon.

Available ranges
 Red, 2008. Grape varieties: Cabernet Sauvignon, Syrah, Caladoc and Tempranillo
 Rosé, 2009. Grape varieties: Syrah and Caladoc
 White, 2009, Grape varieties: Muscat, Viognier, Sauvignon and Sémillo
 Red, 2008. 61% Syrah and 39% Cabernet Sauvignon, French oak barrels
 White 2009. 60% Viognier, 25% Sauvignon and 15% Chardonnay

See also
 Lebanese wine

References

External links
 Jean-Marc Quarin website
 The Union Vinicole du Liban (UVL)website
 Lebanon news - NOW Lebanon - A toast to Lebanese wine 

Wineries of Lebanon
Lebanese brands
Products introduced in 2008